The Bolivian tuco-tuco (Ctenomys boliviensis) is a species of rodent in the family Ctenomyidae. It is found in Argentina, Bolivia, and Paraguay.

References

Tuco-tucos
Mammals described in 1848
Taxonomy articles created by Polbot